The International Tennis Hall of Fame Champions Cup is a professional tennis tournament which is part of the Outback Champions Series. It was formerly known as the Gibson Guitars Champions Cup. The 2008 event will take place August 13–17, 2008, in Newport, Rhode Island, hosted by the International Tennis Hall of Fame.

Results

External links
 Outback Champions Series official website
 International Tennis Hall of Fame official website

Defunct tennis tournaments in the United States
Recurring sporting events established in 2007
Champions Series (senior men's tennis tour)
Tennis tournaments in the United States
Tennis in Rhode Island